Elevator shoes are shoes that have thickened sections of the insoles (known as shoe lifts) under the heels to make the wearer appear taller, or "elevate" them as the name suggests.

Unlike high-heeled shoes, the component of elevator shoes that increases the wearer's height is inside the shoe, hiding it from observers. An elevator shoe, like the platform shoe's heel, can be made from different soles like plastic, wood, or rubber. Shoes with thickened soles are also used in cases of orthopedic problems, although the term "elevator shoe" is not usually used for these.

See also 
 Platform shoe
 Shoe insert
 Dress shoe

References 

Footwear
Human height